Owosso Speedway is a , progressively banked oval short track located east of Ovid, Michigan, between Ovid and Owosso, further east.

Track History
In 1939 the Owosso Speedway opened as a  dirt oval. The track would operate until 1944 when it closed to serve as a POW Camp for captured German soldiers from World War II. These soldiers were housed on the Speedway facilities and were allowed out into the community to do small jobs for the locals.

 The track resumed racing in 1946 with a brand-new high banked  asphalt oval sharing a front stretch with the  mile. In 1953 the  mile was paved, while the  mile remained a dirt track. In 1960 the  mile would go dormant, as it was closed because the track was allegedly too fast to be insured.
 The  mile would be resurrected in 1963 and the facility would continue on that way until 1972 when the big track was paved to go along with the already paved little track.
 In 1983 the track was converted over to dirt, for the first time since 1952 the two tracks were both dirt.

Notable alumni
Benny Parsons – 1973 NASCAR Winston Cup Series Champion
Brad Keselowski – 2012 Monster Energy NASCAR Cup Series Champion
Erik Jones – 2017 Monster Energy NASCAR Cup Series Rookie of the year

Current operations
The Owosso Speedway currently races Saturday night from early-May through September. The weekly classes at the facility are the Pro Late Models, Modifieds  Sportsmans, Pure Stocks. 

The Speedway also features one Winged Sprint Car event a year along with one special event for the Outlaw Super Late Models every year.

References
 http://owossospeedway.com/track-info/about-us
 http://www.waterwinterwonderland.com/speed.asp?id=1647&type=9
 http://owossospeedway.com/track-info/the-record-book
 http://www.na-motorsports.com/Tracks/MI/Owosso.html

External links
Owosso Speedway official site
Owosso Speedway page at Water Winter Wonderland.

Motorsport venues in Michigan
Buildings and structures in Shiawassee County, Michigan
Tourist attractions in Shiawassee County, Michigan
Event venues established in 1939
1939 establishments in Michigan